Konchem Touchlo Vunte Cheputanu is a 2004 Indian Telugu-language romantic drama film directed by Vamsy and starring Sivaji and Veda.

Cast 
Sivaji as Kalidasu
Veda as Alakananda
Prakash Raj as JK

Soundtrack 
The songs were composed by Chakri. All lyrics by Vennelakanti.

Reception 
A critic from Idlebrain.com wrote that "KTVC is a typical Vamsi's film with love, crime and comedy entangled". A critic from Indiaglitz wrote that "Veteran Vamsi is quite good at handling sensitive but quirky human emotions. In Koncham Touch Lo Unte Cheputhanu, he tries to mix it with some mass and market elements".

References

External links 

2000s Telugu-language films
2004 romantic drama films
Films directed by Vamsy
Films scored by Chakri
Indian romantic drama films